A96 or A-96 may refer to:

 A96 road (Scotland), a road connecting Aberdeen and Inverness
 Bundesautobahn 96, a motorway between Lake Constance and Munich in Germany
 Dutch Defence, in the Encyclopaedia of Chess Openings